Leonard Arthur Bolan (16 March 1909 in Lowestoft – 1973) was a professional footballer who played for Lowestoft Town, Tottenham Hotspur and Southend United.

Football career 
Bolan played for his local side Lowesoft Town before having spells at Norwich City in 1930 and West Ham United in 1931 without appearing in the senior team for either club. The outside right joined Tottenham Hotspur where he was involved in 10 matches and scoring three goals between 1933 and 1934. In 1935 Bolan joined Southend United and featured in 121 matches and finding the net on 24 occasions between 1935 and 1940.

References 

1909 births
1973 deaths
People from Lowestoft
English footballers
English Football League players
Lowestoft Town F.C. players
Tottenham Hotspur F.C. players
Southend United F.C. players
Association football outside forwards